The 2007 Men's Youth World Handball Championship (2nd tournament) took place in Bahrain from 26 July–3 August.

Preliminary round

Group A

Group B

Group C

Group D

Placement round

Group P I

Group P II

Main round

Group M I

Group M II

Placement matches

15th/16th

13th/14th

11th/12th

9th/10th

7th/8th

5th/6th

Final round

Semifinals

Bronze medal match

Gold medal match

Final standings

All-star team

Medallists

External links
II Men's Youth World Championship at IHF.info

International handball competitions hosted by Bahrain
Mens Youth World Handball Championship, 2007
World
World Handball Championship youth and junior tournaments